Frona Eunice Wait (1859–1946) was an American author and newspaper writer. From her beginning as a journalist, she rose to become an associate editor for the Overland Monthly.

Biography
Frona Eunice was born in Yolo County, California in 1859. She married John Courtland Wait at a young age in Dayton, Washington. She had two children with Wait, the second of whom, Sylvester James "Vessie" died in 1880. Her circumstances of leaving her husband are unknown but she left him after her son died. From that point she began to work as a journalist, getting her first job with the Santa Rosa Republican newspaper and learning the writing and publishing trade.

In 1887 she was one of only two female staff journalists in San Francisco, working for the San Francisco Examiner. She married Frederick Henry Colburn, October 31, 1900.  Colburn was assistant secretary of the Associated Savings Banks of San Francisco, and had spent time in a variety of businesses including publishing, import and export, and being president of the California Business College.

Overland Monthly
Before editing the Overland Monthly, she contributed articles to it, and wrote books such as the futuristic Yermah the Dorado, published by W. Doxey in 1897 and republished by Alice Harriman in 1913. She wrote anti-suffrage political pamphlets, including 80 per cent. of the women in California do not want the vote.  She is also known in wine circles for her works on California wines. Her book Wines and Vines of California was called an "unquestionable cornerstone of California wine literature" in Wayward Tendrils Quarterly (published for a  wine book collector's society), July 2011.

She joined the staff of the Overland Monthly in November 1923 and rose to become an associate editor. She had been working in publishing, writing and journalism for 36 years, having gotten her start in 1887.

As associate editor, she continued to write. In a sampling of the 1928 issues (Volume 86, numbers 1 through 8), she wrote a short story, two non-fiction essays,  an obituary, and several book reviews.

She was also the subject of a poem by Ambrose Bierce entitled A Competitor, published in his book The Collected Works of Ambrose Bierce.

She died in 1946.

Science fiction

Although most of her books fall firmly into such non-fiction areas as wine tasting and history, Wait did write one book that is often sold as an early work of science fiction. Yermah the Dorado is an adventure story about an Atlantis, in a place that will become San Francisco 11,000 years later.  She published the book originally in 1897. After seeing the effects of the 1906 San Francisco earthquake she made changes to the book.  In her reprint of the book, the author called her book Yermah the Dorado a "pre-vision of what is to be".

Though sold as science fiction, there has been an argument about whether many Victorian era books meet the definition of science fiction. Darko Suvin argues that the book is not science fiction because it lacks a distinct science-fiction narrative throughout the book.

Writings

Books
The Kingship of Mt. Lassen, at Present the Only Active Volcano on the Mainland of the United States, in the Past California's Greatest Benefactor, Nemo Publishing Company, San Francisco 1922
The Stories of El Dorado, 1904
Yermah the Dorado: The Story of a Lost Race, W. Doxey, San Francisco, 1897 and  Alice Harriman Company, New York, 1913
Wines & Vines of California; Or, a Treatise on the Ethics of Wine Drinking, 1889
In Old Vintage Days ... With Decorations by Dorothy Payne, John Henry Nash, San Francisco, 1937
Wines of Valencia

Pamphlets, articles and other works
My Cousin's Wedding Dress, Overland monthly and Out West magazine,Volume: 18, Issue: 107, Nov 1891, pp. 535-542.
Where beauty reigns:Mrs. Smith's Gala Society Ball at the Portland Hotel, undated newspaper.
An interesting and authentic description of a mule-back ride through the quaint, little-known department of Soconusco, Mexico, by Fredrick Henry Colburn and Frona Eunice Wait, 1901.
John Henry Nash, Master Printer, Out West magazine, 1929.
The Romance of a Paper Man and a Marble Woman by Frona Eunice Wait Colburn, Overland Monthly, November and December, 1930.
Online text, Overland Magazine, volume 86, has several articles by Frona Eunice Wait Colburn.

References

External links
 
 
 *Frona and winemaking, has link to biography by John Maher

1859 births
1946 deaths
20th-century American novelists
American magazine editors
American science fiction writers
Writers from the San Francisco Bay Area
American women journalists
Women science fiction and fantasy writers
American women novelists
People from Woodland, California
Novelists from California
Women magazine editors
20th-century American women writers